Discovery Shed  (Also simply known as Shed) was a TV channel in the United Kingdom from Discovery, Inc. which replaced Discovery Real Time Extra. The channel launched on 20 March 2009.
The channel featured programming covering fishing, DIY, construction, cars, bikes, and outdoor extreme adventure. The network was superseded by the streaming platform Discovery+, which effectively carries all of its content, and it was discontinued with immediate effect on 6 January 2021, the same fate which befell Discovery Home & Health.

See also 
 Discovery Channel
 Discovery Real Time 
 Discovery Turbo

References

External links 
 Official Site

Television channels and stations established in 2009
Television channels and stations disestablished in 2021
2009 establishments in the United Kingdom
2021 disestablishments in the United Kingdom
Defunct television channels in the United Kingdom
Warner Bros. Discovery networks
Shed